This list of waterbodies of Corse-du-Sud includes static bodies of water (lakes, reservoirs, coastal lagoons) and flowing bodies of water (rivers and streams) in the department of Corse-du-Sud on the island of Corsica.

Static waterbodies

Natural lakes 

Lakes in the Monte Rotondo massif include:

 Lac de Creno
 
 

Lakes in the Monte Renoso massif include:
 Lac de Bracca
 Lac de Vitalaca

Lakes in the Monte Incudine massif include:
 Lac du Monte Tignoso

Artificial reservoirs

Artificial reservoirs built to store water for drinking, irrigation or hydroelectric power generation include:
 Ortolo
 Ospedale
 Talza
 Tolla
 Rizzanese/Zoza

Coastal lagoons

 Étang de Balistra 
 Étang de Santa Giulia

Rivers and streams 

Rivers and streams  in Corse-du-Sud are listed below in clockwise sequence, from east to south to west to north, with their main tributaries.

East coast

Solenzara
Cavu
Oso	
Lagunienu
Stabiacciu
Francolu

West coast

Canella
Ortolo
Rizzanese
Fiumicicoli
Chiuvone 
Baraci
Butturacci
Taravo	
Prunelli
Ese 
Gravona 
Lava
Liscia
Sagone
Liamone
Cruzzini
Guagno 
Chiuni
Porto

See also

List of waterbodies of Haute-Corse

 
Lists of lakes